The Iraqi National Security Council (INSC) was the body in charge of coordinating Iraq's national security, intelligence and foreign policy strategy. It was established in 2004.

Council powers
 Consideration of policies on the security and integrity of the Union, including draft legislation to ensure the achievement of the National Security Strategy.
 Directing the various state agencies to develop their strategies in the interest of national security.
 Establish the necessary mechanisms and procedures for coordination between the various state agencies to achieve national security.
 Work to strengthen the capacity of the state agencies in the face of crises and disasters and ensure the proper management in case of occurrence.
 Supervising the preparation of the strategic plan for national security and its adoption in order to ensure and achieve effective response to threats to national security.
 Supervise the development of a unified information base on the sources of threats, risks and challenges that can face the state.
 To give an opinion on the draft conventions and treaties relating to national security before issuing them.
 Proposing the declaration of martial law and general mobilization.

Membership
The INSC was chaired by the Mohammed Shia' Al Sudani (who is also Prime Minister).

References

External links 
 Official Site

2004 establishments in Iraq
Government agencies established in 2004
Foreign relations of Iraq
Government agencies of Iraq
Irag